Badai Pasti Berlalu may refer to:

Badai Pasti Berlalu (novel), a novel by Indonesian author Marga T
Badai Pasti Berlalu (film), a film by Indonesian director Teguh Karya
Badai Pasti Berlalu (album), soundtrack album of the film
"Badai Pasti Berlalu" (song), title song of the film